Robert E. Johnson (July 9, 1909 – December 1, 1995) was an American lawyer and politician from New York.

Life
He was born on July 9, 1909. He attended the public schools in Staten Island.

Johnson was a member of the New York State Senate (24th D.) in 1941 and 1942.

He was again a member of the State Senate in 1947. In August 1947, he resigned his seat, and was appointed by Governor Thomas E. Dewey as District Attorney of Richmond County. In November 1947, Johnson ran to succeed himself, but was defeated by Democrat Herman Methfessel.

Johnson died on December 1, 1995.

Sources

1909 births
1995 deaths
People from Staten Island
Republican Party New York (state) state senators
Richmond County District Attorneys
20th-century American politicians